Braden Airpark (FAA LID: N43), also known as Easton Airport, is a small airport located about three nautical miles north of the central business district of Easton, Pennsylvania. The airport is owned by the Lehigh-Northampton Airport Authority, which also owns Lehigh Valley International Airport and Allentown Queen City Municipal Airport.

History
A $325,000 county grant was approved June 6, 2017, to replace the aging terminal, to be matched by funds from LNAA. A modular building is planned to serve as the terminal while long-term plans are developed for the airport.

Facilities and aircraft
This small airport mostly serves small general aviation aircraft. The single 18/36 runway is 1956 feet long and has a 50-foot wide asphalt surface in the center of a 165-foot wide turf strip.

References

External links
Official website

Airports in Pennsylvania
Easton, Pennsylvania
Transportation buildings and structures in Northampton County, Pennsylvania